The following are international rankings of Iceland.

Current ranking

References

Iceland